Willie the Wildcat can refer to:

Willie the Wildcat (Kansas State), the athletics mascot at Kansas State University in Manhattan, Kansas.
Willie the Wildcat (Northwestern), the athletics mascot at Northwestern University in Evanston and Chicago, Illinois.
Willie the Wildcat (Abilene Christian), the athletics mascot at Abilene Christian University in Abilene, Texas.
Willie T. Wildcat, the mascot at Johnson & Wales University
Wildcat Willie, the mascot of World Championship Wrestling, who was portrayed by Gary Hedrick
Coincidentally, the first two mascots "came to life" in 1947 in separate events.